The Cambridge Network is a commercial business networking organisation for business people and academics working in technology fields in the Cambridge area of the UK. The businesses and organisations that make up its membership are typical of those found in the 'Cambridge Cluster' or Silicon Fen.  The network is inclusive and encourages cross-sector and cross-business engagement so that new areas of innovation are started.

The network was founded in 1997 by Nigel Brown, David Cleevely, Fred Hallsworth, Hermann Hauser, Anthony Ross and Alec Broers. 

Chair of Cambridge Network Ltd is Dr Andy Harter, Group CEO of RealVNC, and current board members include founder Hermann Hauser, Alex van Someren Amadeus Capital Partners, Professor Andy Neely, pro-vice-chancellor of Cambridge University, Lee Welham of Deloitte, Marcus Johnson of Kirly Ltd, Prof Roderick Watkins of Anglia Ruskin University, Peter Taylor of TTP Group, David Cleevely, Andrew Lynn of Fluidic Analytics, Colin Manktelow of NW Brown, Caroline Rowland of Arm Holdings, Vicki Sanderson, Andy Williams Astra Zeneca, Ken Woodberry of Microsoft Research and former Cambridge Network CEO Claire Ruskin. 
Its president is the vice-chancellor of the University of Cambridge, Professor Stephen Toope.  John Gourd is chief executive, appointed in September 2019 and David Mardle of Goodwin Procter is company secretary.

Activities
The organisation's mission is "We raise the game for business in Cambridge, and through that we try to raise the game for economic growth in the UK.  Cambridge Network brings people together - from business and academia - to meet each other and share ideas, encouraging collaboration and partnership for shared success. ".
It has over 1,000 corporate and 300 individual members.
The Cambridge Network facilitates a number of other services, including
The Cambridge Corporate Gateway – a service dedicated to matching external organisation's technological requirement to companies in the Cambridge area.
Open meetings and lectures intended to bring together business and academic interests.
The Learning Collaboration – encouraging local companies to pool training resources.
The Recruitment Gateway – a service designed to attract and retain the best and most talented people to work in Cambridge. 

A number of special interest groups have arisen from Cambridge Network activities.

References

External links
Cambridge Network website

British companies established in 1998
Organisations based in Cambridge
Economy of Cambridgeshire